A functoid is a tool for applying methods to data via a GUI drag 'n drop interface from within the BizTalk Mapping tool.

In a typical BizTalk map, the data is copied from a source to a destination by dragging a line between the two. A functoid sits in the middle of this operation and applies its method to the incoming data so as to transform it to the requirements of the destination.

By default functoids are arranged into 9 categories based on their functions.

 String Functoids
 Mathematical Functoids
 Logical Functoids
 Date / Time Functoids
 Conversion Functoids
 Scientific Functoids
 Cumulative Functoids
 Database Functoids
 Advanced Functoids

Microsoft BizTalk Server offers the ability to create custom functoids by referencing a DLL into a BizTalk project and accessing its methods.
It is also possible to use inline C# or inline XSLT to manipulate data as it is being copied from the source to the destination.

Refer: https://msdn.microsoft.com/en-us/library/ee267898(v=bts.10).aspx

References

External links
Microsoft documentation - Functoids in Maps
Microsoft BizTalk Server Homepage
A Quick look at the new functoids in BizTalk Server 2006 (CodeProject Article)

Inter-process communication
Windows Server System